Mamoon Sadiq (born 10 April 1965) is a Pakistani sailor. He competed at the 1988 Summer Olympics and the 1992 Summer Olympics.

References

External links
 

1965 births
Living people
Pakistani male sailors (sport)
Olympic sailors of Pakistan
Sailors at the 1988 Summer Olympics – 470
Sailors at the 1992 Summer Olympics – 470
Place of birth missing (living people)
Asian Games medalists in sailing
Sailors at the 1994 Asian Games
Sailors at the 1998 Asian Games
Sailors at the 2006 Asian Games
Medalists at the 1994 Asian Games
Medalists at the 1998 Asian Games
Asian Games silver medalists for Pakistan
20th-century Pakistani people